In mathematics, a tangent vector is a vector that is tangent to a curve or surface at a given point. Tangent vectors are described in the differential geometry of curves in the context of curves in Rn. More generally, tangent vectors are elements of a tangent space of a differentiable manifold. Tangent vectors can also be described in terms of germs.

Motivation 
Before proceeding to a general definition of the tangent vector, we discuss its use in calculus and its tensor properties.

Calculus 
Let  be a parametric smooth curve. The unit tangent vector is given by

Example 
Given the curve

Contravariance 

then the tangent vector field  is given by

Under a change of coordinates

the tangent vector  in the -coordinate system is given by

where we have used the Einstein summation convention. Therefore, a tangent vector of a smooth curve will transform as a contravariant tensor of order one under a change of coordinates.

Definition 
We define the directional derivative in the  direction at a point  by

The tangent vector at the point  may then be defined as

Properties 
Then

Tangent vector on manifolds

Note that the derivation will by definition have the Leibniz property

See also

References

Bibliography 
 .
 .
 .

Vectors (mathematics and physics)